Ipuaçu is a municipality in the state of Santa Catarina in the South region of Brazil. Since 2008, the city is a regular setting of crop circles, which always appear on October or November and are often studied by Brazilian ufologists.

See also
List of municipalities in Santa Catarina

References

Municipalities in Santa Catarina (state)